Melkamu Benjamin Daniel Frauendorf (born 12 January 2004) is a professional footballer who plays as a midfielder for English club Liverpool. Born in Ethiopia, he is a youth international for Germany.

Club career
Frauendorf joined Liverpool in 2020, after previously playing for 1899 Hoffenheim, where he scored 7 goals in 40 games for the U17 team.

He made his competitive first-team debut in an FA Cup third round match against Shrewsbury Town on 9 January 2022.

On 9 November 2022, he started his first game for Liverpool in the win against Derby County in the third round of the EFL Cup at Anfield.

International career
Frauendorf is eligible to play for Ethiopia and Germany, and has been capped at various youth international levels for the latter.

Career statistics

Club

References

External links
Profile at the Liverpool F.C. website

 

2004 births
Association football midfielders
Living people
German footballers
Germany youth international footballers
Ethiopian footballers
German people of Ethiopian descent
Ethiopian emigrants to Germany
German sportspeople of African descent
Sportspeople of Ethiopian descent
Liverpool F.C. players
German expatriate footballers
Ethiopian expatriate footballers
German expatriate sportspeople in England